UEB or Ueb may refer to:

União dos Escoteiros do Brasil, the Union of Brazilian Scouts
Unified English Braille Code
The Universal edit button
The Université européenne de Bretagne, a confederation of universities in France
The Uganda Electricity Board (see Energy in Uganda)
The theoretical 192nd element, unennbium (Ueb)
The United Effort Brotherhood, a fictional group in the show Big Love